The ssNA-helicase RNA motif is a conserved RNA structure that was discovered by bioinformatics.
Although the ssNA-helicase motif was published as an RNA candidate, there is some reason to suspect that it might function as a single-stranded DNA.  In terms of secondary structure, RNA and DNA are difficult to distinguish when only sequence information is available.

ssNA-helicase motif RNAs are found in Bacillota and Actinomycetota.  The ssNA-helicase motif occurs upstream of genes that likely function as helicases, possible on an RNA substrate.  Some evidence suggests that these genes are part of single-stranded RNA viruses (or presumably phages, as the RNAs are located in bacterial sequences).  However, there is also a suggestion of an association with singled-stranded DNA viruses that infect plants.  This latter potential association could mean that the ssNA-helicase motif actually functions as singled-stranded DNA.  If the RNA is indeed part of a phage, then its location upstream of a protein-coding gene might just reflect the typical gene organization of phages, and not a direct functional or regulatory association between the RNA and the downstream gene.  Therefore, it is ambiguous whether ssNA-helicase motif examples function as cis-regulatory elements or whether they operate in trans, and also whether they function as RNA or DNA.

References

Non-coding RNA